North Manchester Rugby Club (aka North Manchester RUFC) is an amateur sports club situated 5 miles north of the centre of Manchester. It is the only rugby union club in the city of Manchester, north of the centre. 

Established originally in 1921 in Prestwich as Prestwich Rugby Union Football Club, the club moved to Rhodes Cricket Club in 1951 and changed its name to Prestwich & Middleton Rugby Union Football Club.  A further move in 1985, this time to the current ground Tudor Lodge in Moston saw the club rename again, this time to North Manchester Rugby Club.  In 1991 the club merged with the struggling Oldham college Rugby Union Football Club, maintaining the name of North Manchester.  

The first XV won North Lancs 2 2013/14 and were undefeated in doing so gaining promotion to North Lancs 1, now called Lancashire (North).

Club Honours
North Lancashire Division 2 champions: 2013–14

References

External links 
 Official North Manchester Rugby Club website
 Manchester Rugby Union Development Group

English rugby union teams
1921 establishments in England
Rugby clubs established in 1921